The following outline is provided as an overview of and topical guide to Turkmenistan:

Turkmenistan is a sovereign Turkic country located in Central Asia.  The name Turkmenistan is derived from Persian, meaning "land of the Turkmen". The name of its capital, Ashgabat, derived from Persian as well, loosely translating as "the city of love". Until 1991, it was a constituent republic of the Soviet Union, the Turkmen Soviet Socialist Republic. It is bordered by Afghanistan to the southeast, Iran to the southwest, Uzbekistan to the northeast, Kazakhstan to the northwest, and the Caspian Sea to the west.

Although it is wealthy in natural resources in certain areas, most of the country is covered by the Karakum (Black Sands) Desert. It has a one-party system, though other parties exist.  The country  was ruled by President for Life Saparmurat Niyazov until his death on 21 December 2006. Presidential elections were held on 11 February 2007. Gurbanguly Berdimuhammedow was declared the winner with 89% of the vote. He was sworn in on 14 February 2007, and has been re-elected twice since, in 2012 and 2017.

General reference

Pronunciation:
Common English country name:  Turkmenistan
Official English country name:  Turkmenistan
Common endonym(s): Türkmenistan  
Official endonym(s): Türkmenistan  
Adjectival(s): Turkmen
Demonym(s):
International rankings of Turkmenistan
ISO country codes:  TM, TKM, 795
ISO region codes:  See ISO 3166-2:TM
Internet country code top-level domain:  .tm

Geography of Turkmenistan

Geography of Turkmenistan
Turkmenistan is: a landlocked country
Location:
Northern Hemisphere and Eastern Hemisphere
Eurasia
Asia
Central Asia
Time zone:  UTC+05
Extreme points of Turkmenistan
High:  Aýrybaba 
Low:  Akjagaýa çöketligi 
Land boundaries:  3,736 km
 1,621 km
 992 km
 744 km
 379 km
Coastline:  none
Population of Turkmenistan: 5,240,000 (July 2013, UN estimate) – 117th most populous country

Area of Turkmenistan: 488,100 km² – 53rd by total area
Atlas of Turkmenistan

Environment of Turkmenistan

Environment of Turkmenistan
Climate of Turkmenistan
Environmental issues in Turkmenistan
Protected areas of Turkmenistan
Wildlife of Turkmenistan
Fauna of Turkmenistan
Birds of Turkmenistan
Mammals of Turkmenistan

Natural geographic features of Turkmenistan

Glaciers of Turkmenistan: None
Islands of Turkmenistan: None
Lakes of Turkmenistan
Mountains of Turkmenistan
Volcanoes in Turkmenistan: None
Rivers of Turkmenistan
List of World Heritage Sites in Turkmenistan

Regions of Turkmenistan

Regions of Turkmenistan

Ecoregions of Turkmenistan

Administrative divisions of Turkmenistan

Administrative divisions of Turkmenistan
Provinces of Turkmenistan
Districts of Turkmenistan

Provinces of Turkmenistan

Provinces of Turkmenistan
Aşgabat
Ahal Province
Balkan Province
Daşoguz Province
Lebap Province
Mary Province

Districts of Turkmenistan

Districts of Turkmenistan
The provinces of Turkmenistan are divided into  districts, which may be either counties or cities.

Demography of Turkmenistan

Demographics of Turkmenistan

Government and politics of Turkmenistan

Politics of Turkmenistan
Form of government: Presidential republic
Capital of Turkmenistan: Ashgabat
Elections in Turkmenistan
Political parties in Turkmenistan

Branches of government of Turkmenistan

Government of Turkmenistan

Executive branch of Turkmenistan
Head of state: President of Turkmenistan, Gurbanguly Berdimuhammedow
Head of government: President of Turkmenistan, Gurbanguly Berdimuhammedow

Legislative branch of Turkmenistan

Parliament of Turkmenistan (bicameral per 2020 constitutional amendment)
Upper house: Halk Maslahaty
Lower house: Mejlis

Judicial branch of Turkmenistan

Court system of Turkmenistan
Supreme Court of Turkmenistan

Foreign relations of Turkmenistan

Foreign relations of Turkmenistan
Diplomatic missions in Turkmenistan
Diplomatic missions of Turkmenistan

International organization membership

International organization membership of Turkmenistan
Turkmenistan is a member of:

Asian Development Bank (ADB)
Commonwealth of Independent States (CIS)
Economic Cooperation Organization (ECO)
Euro-Atlantic Partnership Council (EAPC)
European Bank for Reconstruction and Development (EBRD)
Food and Agriculture Organization (FAO)
Group of 77 (G77)
International Bank for Reconstruction and Development (IBRD)
International Civil Aviation Organization (ICAO)
International Criminal Police Organization (Interpol)
International Development Association (IDA)
International Federation of Red Cross and Red Crescent Societies (IFRCS)
International Finance Corporation (IFC)
International Labour Organization (ILO)
International Maritime Organization (IMO)
International Monetary Fund (IMF)
International Olympic Committee (IOC)
International Organization for Migration (IOM) (observer)
International Organization for Standardization (ISO) (correspondent)
International Red Cross and Red Crescent Movement (ICRM)

International Telecommunication Union (ITU)
Islamic Development Bank (IDB)
Multilateral Investment Guarantee Agency (MIGA)
Nonaligned Movement (NAM)
Organisation of Islamic Cooperation (OIC)
Organization for Security and Cooperation in Europe (OSCE)
Organisation for the Prohibition of Chemical Weapons (OPCW)
Partnership for Peace (PFP)
Shanghai Cooperation Organisation (SCO) (guest)
United Nations (UN)
United Nations Conference on Trade and Development (UNCTAD)
United Nations Educational, Scientific, and Cultural Organization (UNESCO)
United Nations Industrial Development Organization (UNIDO)
Universal Postal Union (UPU)
World Customs Organization (WCO)
World Federation of Trade Unions (WFTU)
World Health Organization (WHO)
World Intellectual Property Organization (WIPO)
World Meteorological Organization (WMO)
World Tourism Organization (UNWTO)

Law and order in Turkmenistan

Law of Turkmenistan
Capital punishment in Turkmenistan
Constitution of Turkmenistan
Human rights in Turkmenistan
LGBT rights in Turkmenistan
Freedom of religion in Turkmenistan
Law enforcement in Turkmenistan
Corruption in Turkmenistan
Human trafficking in Turkmenistan
Ministry of Internal Affairs (Turkmenistan)
Polygamy in Turkmenistan
Prostitution in Turkmenistan
Supreme Court of Turkmenistan
Turkmen nationality law

Military of Turkmenistan

Military of Turkmenistan
Command
Commander-in-chief:President of Turkmenistan
Forces
Armed Forces of Turkmenistan
Chief of the General Staff (Turkmenistan)
Ministry of Defense (Turkmenistan)
State Border Service of Turkmenistan
State Security Council of Turkmenistan
Turkmen Air Force
Turkmen Ground Forces
Turkmen Internal Troops
Turkmen National Guard
Turkmen Naval Forces

Local government in Turkmenistan

Local government in Turkmenistan

History of Turkmenistan

History of Turkmenistan

Culture of Turkmenistan

Culture of Turkmenistan
Cuisine of Turkmenistan
Languages of Turkmenistan
Media in Turkmenistan
National symbols of Turkmenistan
Coat of arms of Turkmenistan
Flag of Turkmenistan
National anthem of Turkmenistan
People of Turkmenistan
Prostitution in Turkmenistan
Public holidays in Turkmenistan
Religion in Turkmenistan
Buddhism in Turkmenistan
Christianity in Turkmenistan
Islam in Turkmenistan
List of World Heritage Sites in Turkmenistan

Art and Culture in Turkmenistan
Cinema of Turkmenistan
Music of Turkmenistan
Television in Turkmenistan
Turkmen carpet
Turkmen cuisine
Turkmen language
Turkmen literature

Sports in Turkmenistan

Football in Turkmenistan
Turkmenistan national football team
Ice hockey in Turkmenistan
Turkmenistan men's national ice hockey team
Turkmenistan at the Olympics

Economy and infrastructure of Turkmenistan

Economy of Turkmenistan
Economic rank, by nominal GDP (2007): 83rd (eighty-third)
Agriculture in Turkmenistan
Communications in Turkmenistan
Internet in Turkmenistan
Companies of Turkmenistan
Currency of Turkmenistan: Manat
ISO 4217: TMT
Energy in Turkmenistan
Health care in Turkmenistan
Tourism in Turkmenistan
Transport in Turkmenistan
Airports in Turkmenistan
Rail transport in Turkmenistan

Education in Turkmenistan

Education in Turkmenistan

Health in Turkmenistan

Health in Turkmenistan

See also

Turkmenistan
Index of Turkmenistan-related articles
List of international rankings
List of Turkmenistan-related topics
Member state of the United Nations
Outline of Asia
Outline of geography

References

External links

Turkmenistan government information portal
Music of Turkmenistan
The Turkmenistan Project - weekly news and analysis in English and Russian
CIA Factbook
Official photo gallery from Turkmenistan and Ashgabat
Largest Photo gallery of Turkmenistan and Ashgabat
Photo Gallery from Turkmenistan (in German)
Encyclopedia of the Nations
All schools of Turkmenistan 
BBC News country profile
View Ashgabat, Dashoguz, and Mary on Google Earth
Turkmenistan Music and Videos
Turkmenistan-News Forum Chat. Search file Turkmenistan
Turkmenistan Oil and Gas Information
Turkmenistan Social
Turkmenistan Blogs
Turkmen-English Dictionary
Turkmenistan News
Turkmen literature, poems, poetry, articles

Turkmenistan
 1